Holy Rosary Cathedral can refer to:

Bangladesh
 Holy Rosary Cathedral, Chittagong

Canada
 Holy Rosary Cathedral (Vancouver), a Roman Catholic church in British Columbia
 Holy Rosary Cathedral (Regina, Saskatchewan), the Mother Church of the Roman Catholic Archdiocese of Regina

Curaçao
 Queen of the Most Holy Rosary Cathedral, Willemstad

India
 Cathedral of the Most Holy Rosary, Kolkata
 Cathedral of the Most Holy Rosary, Cuttack

Indonesia
 Holy Rosary Cathedral, Semarang (Cathedral of the Virgin Mary, Queen of the Holy Rosary), a Roman Catholic church in Semarang

Taiwan
 Holy Rosary Cathedral, Kaohsiung, the oldest Catholic church in Taiwan

United States
Rosary Cathedral (Toledo, Ohio) a Roman Catholic church in Toledo, Ohio

See also
 Cathedral of Our Lady of the Rosary (disambiguation)